Vladimir Yevgenyevich Mikhaylovskiy (born 22 June 1989) is a Russian footballer. He plays for Italian club Sanremese. Besides Russia, he has played in San Marino and Italy.

Career

In 2009, he signed for Tre Penne. In 2020, he signed for Sanremese.

References

External links
 

1989 births
Sportspeople from Tolyatti
Living people
Russian footballers
Association football defenders
S.P. Tre Penne players
A.C. Gozzano players
Russian Second League players
Serie D players
Russian expatriate footballers
Expatriate footballers in San Marino
Expatriate footballers in Italy